Nalaka may refer to

Nalaka Godahewa, Chairman of Securities Exchange Commission in Sri Lanka
Nalaka Gunawardene, writer and journalist
Nalaka Kolonne, Sri Lankan politician
Nalaka Kottegoda (born 1979), Sri Lankan politician
Nalaka Roshan (born 1993), Sri Lankan international footballer
Nalaka Vithanage, Sri Lankan director
Nalaka, Florida, a town developed around the turpentine industry that died out once the trees were gone

Sinhalese masculine given names